Bjørn Fredrik Stephansen (born 6 February 1974) is a retired Norwegian football defender.

He started his career in Randesund IL, joining city rivals IK Start in 1994. Playing sparingly, he was loaned out to second-tier Ullern IF in 1996. From 1997 he was a regular for Start, but moved back east in 2000 to play two seasons for Strømsgodset and three seasons for Bærum including a loan to Follo. In 2006 and 2007 he was playing assistant manager of hometown club Flekkerøy.

References

1974 births
Living people
Sportspeople from Kristiansand
Norwegian footballers
IK Start players
Ullern IF players
Strømsgodset Toppfotball players
Bærum SK players
Follo FK players
Flekkerøy IL players
Eliteserien players
Norwegian First Division players
Association football defenders